The Asutra is a novel by Jack Vance published in 1974.

Plot summary
The Asutra is a novel in which the hero must overthrow the rulers of his world.

Reception
Dave Langford reviewed The Asutra for White Dwarf #99, and stated that "Some of the freshness leaked out of this series by book 3: The Asutra isn't actively bad but seems perfunctory, the result of over-hasty production."

Reviews
Review by Chris Evans (1977) in Vector 84
Review by Robin Marcus (1977) in Paperback Parlour, December 1977
Review by Jerry L. Parsons (1979) in Science Fiction & Fantasy Book Review, August 1979
Review by Bruce Gillespie (1989) in SF Commentary, #67

References

1974 American novels
1974 science fiction novels
Dell Publishing books
Novels set on fictional planets